The FC Basel 1907–08 season was their fifteenth season since the club was formed. The club's chairman was Dr. Siegfried Pfeiffer, it was his first presidential term. FC Basel played their home games in the Landhof.

Overview 
First, a mention to the football ground Landhof. The first ever international match between the Swiss national team and the German national team was scheduled to take place here in April 1908. Therefore the authorities decided to build the first spectator stand in Switzerland, at the cost of four thousand Swiss Francs and a building time of more than six months. Following this, the ground was used a number of times as international venue.

Second, a mention to club chairman Siegfried Pfeiffer, who had joined the club in 1899. During his presidential term for the club, he played his only international game for his country. Pfeiffer scored two goals in this legendary 5–3 victory over Germany.

Then, a mention to team captain Daniel Hug. It was his third year in succession as Captain and he also played in the afore mentioned international game. Hug was Basel's most prominent and their largest player and as captain he led the team trainings and was responsible for the line-ups. It would end out, that at the end of the season he would transferred to Italy, to play professionally for Genoa C.F.C. in the Italian football championship. 

Before the season started, Basel played three test games, in La Chaux-de-Fonds, in Freiburg im Breisgau and in Strassburg. They lost the first two games but came home with a 10–0 victory over FC Frankonia 1900 Strassburg. They also played four friendly games during the winter break. The first in their home stadium against Strassburger FV. The other three were away, the first game in Geneva. Over the Christmas period the team travelled to Mannheim and Hanau to play Mannheimer FG 1896 and 1. Hanauer FC 1893. The first was won the second ended in a defeat.

The 1907–08 Serie A was divided into two regional groups, an east group and a west group. Together with local rivals Old Boys, Basel were allocated to the east group. The other teams in that group were  Aarau, Grasshopper Club, Zürich, Young Fellows Zürich, Winterthur and St. Gallen. The group was an evenly balanced group and at the end of the season the teams from second to eighth position were only separated by six points. Only Winterthur had a good run of results and were able to move clear at the top of the league table, winning the group with a six point advantage.

Thus Winterthur qualified for the league final, which was held in Basel on 31 May 1908. Winterthur won the Swiss Championship title beating Young Boys Bern by four goals to one.

Players 
Squad members

Results

Legend

Friendly matches

Pre-season

Winter break

Serie A

East group results

East group league table

See also
 History of FC Basel
 List of FC Basel players
 List of FC Basel seasons

References

Sources 
 Rotblau: Jahrbuch Saison 2014/2015. Publisher: FC Basel Marketing AG. 
 Die ersten 125 Jahre. Publisher: Josef Zindel im Friedrich Reinhardt Verlag, Basel. 
 Switzerland 1907-08 at RSSSF
 FCB team 1907-08 at fcb-archiv.ch

External links
 FC Basel official site

FC Basel seasons
Basel